The Black Suspension Bridge (also known as the Kaibab Trail Suspension Bridge) spans the Colorado River in the inner canyon of Grand Canyon National Park. The bridge is part of the South Kaibab Trail and is the river crossing used by mules going to Phantom Ranch.

History

Before 1907, the only way to cross the river was by boat, a dangerous method which cost many lives. Then, outdoorsman David Rust built a privately-operated cableway. The cableway was a  steel cage large enough for one mule or several people that would carry passengers across the river, but the passage was considered precarious. Theodore Roosevelt used the cableway in 1913. The second crossing was a suspension bridge that lacked stiffness. It was built in 1920 and proved to be too flexible to safely carry pedestrians across the river as the number of visitors to the park was increasing.

Black Bridge was designed by Ward Webber and constructed by John Lawrence. The Black Bridge was built in 1928. It would remain the only crossing of the river for hundreds of river miles until the Silver Bridge was built just downstream within the park during the 1960s. As motorized vehicles could not access the construction site, humans and mules transported the 122 tons in materials down the nine miles of trail. Walking single file, 42 Havasupai tribesmen carried the one-ton,  suspension cables.

Recognition
The bridge was documented by the Historic American Engineering Record in 1984. On February 23, 2019, the bridge was recognized as a National Historic Civil Engineering Landmark by the American Society of Civil Engineers, saying, "The Kaibab Trail Suspension Bridge is a prime example of engineering innovation. Engineering this bridge at the base of one of the world’s greatest wonders—the Grand Canyon—illustrates the resourcefulness and innovative spirit of the civil engineers responsible for this project." As of 2019, the bridge has remained unchanged since it was constructed 91 years ago.

See also
List of bridges documented by the Historic American Engineering Record in Arizona

References

External links

Buildings and structures in Grand Canyon National Park
Bridges in Arizona
Suspension bridges in Arizona
Bridges completed in 1928
1928 establishments in Arizona
Bridges over the Colorado River
Historic American Engineering Record in Arizona
Historic Civil Engineering Landmarks